This article compares the Grand Slam and Olympic tournament results of male tennis players who reached at least one Grand Slam final. The Grand Slam tournaments are the Australian Open, the French Open, Wimbledon, and the U.S. Open. All data is from the International Tennis Federation men's circuit database.

Legend

Less frequent qualifiers are explained in the notes below the table.

Athletes in bold are considered to be still in championship tennis.

1967–1972
Winner of most titles: Rod Laver, with 5.

1973–1978
Winner of most titles: Björn Borg, with 6.

1979–1984
Winner of most titles: John McEnroe, with 7.

1985–1990
Winner of most titles: Ivan Lendl, with 7.

1991–1996
Winner of most titles: Pete Sampras, with 7.

1997–2002
Winner of most titles: Pete Sampras, with 6.

2003–2008
Winner of most titles: Roger Federer, with 13.

2009–2014
Winner of most titles: Rafael Nadal, with 9.

2015–2020
Winner of most titles: Novak Djokovic, with 10.

2021–2026 
Winner of most titles: Novak Djokovic, with 5.

See also
Tennis performance timeline comparison (women)
Tennis performance timeline comparison (women) (1884–1977)

References

Sources
International Tennis Federation website

p